Warenius is a genus of sea snails, marine gastropod mollusks in the family Eosiphonidae, the true whelks and their allies.

Species
Species within the genus Warenius include:
 Warenius crosnieri (Bouchet & Warén, 1986)
 Warenius nankaiensis (Okutani & Iwasaki, 2003)

References

 Bouchet, P. & Warén, A., 1986. - Mollusca Gastropoda: Taxonomical notes on tropical deep water Buccinidae with descriptions of new taxa. Mémoires du Muséum national d'Histoire naturelle 133("1985"): 457-517

External links
 Kantor Y.I., Kosyan A., Sorokin P., Herbert D.G. & Fedosov A. (2020). Review of the abysso-hadal genus Bayerius (Gastropoda: Neogastropoda: Buccinidae) from the North-West Pacific, with description of two new species. Deep Sea Research Part I: Oceanographic Research Papers. 160: 103256

Eosiphonidae